Mark Brennan may refer to:

 Mark Brennan (footballer) (born 1965), English footballer
 Mark E. Brennan (born 1947), American Roman Catholic bishop
 Mark A. Brennan (born 1968), Canadian landscape painter 
 Mark Brennan (Neighbours), a fictional character from the Australian soap opera Neighbours